Monilesaurus rouxii, commonly known as Roux's forest lizard, Roux's forest calotes, or the forest blood sucker, is a species of arboreal, diurnal, agamid lizard, which is endemic to hills of peninsular India. In July 2018, it was proposed that the species should be transferred to the new genus Monilesaurus.

Etymology
The specific name, rouxii, is in honor of Jean Louis Florent Polydore Roux, who was a French painter and naturalist.

Description
Its body has an olive-brown color, with a lighter belly, a dark band along the side of the head on to the neck, and dark lines radiating from the eye. The limbs are slender, with elongated toes. Two small groups of spines adorn each side of the neck. In males, the upper part of the head, nape, and gular pouch become brick-red in the breeding season.

Distribution and habitat
Monilesaurus rouxii  is endemic to hills of peninsular India, including the Western Ghats from Surat Dangs till Palghat; and parts of the Eastern Ghats (Shevaroys, Yelagiri, Melagiri, and in Malkangiri, Araku, Devarakonda) and hills of Deccan plateau (Bellary, Sandur). It has been reported largely from the wet hill forest tracts of peninsular India, except the far south. The species is generally widespread and common throughout its range.

Ecology
M. rouxii is an insectivore, hunting during the day both on the ground and in trees. It is oviparous, breeding between April and September.

References

External links

Further reading
Boulenger GA (1890). The Fauna of British India, Including Ceylon and Burma. Reptilia and Batrachia. London: Secretary of State for India in Council. (Taylor and Francis, printers). xviii + 541 pp. (Calotes rouxii, p. 142).
Ganesh SR, Arumugam M (2016). "Species Richness of Montane Herpetofauna of Southern Eastern Ghats, India: A Historical Resume and a Descriptive Checklist". Russian Journal of Herpetology 23 (1): 7-24.
Das I (2002). A Photographic Guide to Snakes and other Reptiles of India. Sanibel Island, Florida: Ralph Curtis Books. 144 pp. . (Calotes rouxii, p. 73).

Monilesaurus
Reptiles of India
Endemic fauna of India
Reptiles described in 1837
Taxa named by Gabriel Bibron
Taxa named by André Marie Constant Duméril